New Jersey's 14th congressional district in the House of Representatives was eliminated after the 1990 Census. As a result of the congressional apportionment performed after this Census, New Jersey lost one seat and was reduced to thirteen seats in the House of Representatives.

New Jersey had gained a fourteenth seat following the 1930 Census, and had as many as fifteen seats following the 1960 and 1970 Censuses. After 1980, New Jersey was back down to fourteen seats.

In the 1980s, the district covered an area surrounding Jersey City, and was represented for seven terms by Frank Guarini.  With the new lines drawn after the 1990 Census, this seat was effectively renumbered as the 13th district.

History and representation
The 14th congressional district (together with the 13th district) was created starting with the 73rd United States Congress in 1933, based on redistricting following the United States Census, 1930.

List of members representing the district

Notes

References

 Congressional Biographical Directory of the United States 1774–present

14
Essex County, New Jersey
Hudson County, New Jersey
Former congressional districts of the United States
Constituencies established in 1933
1933 establishments in New Jersey
Constituencies disestablished in 1993
1993 disestablishments in New Jersey